Bookmarks is a bimonthly American literary magazine dedicated to general readers, book groups, and librarians. It carries the tagline, "For everyone who hasn't read everything." Launched in 2002, Bookmarks summarizes and distills published book reviews and includes articles covering classic and contemporary authors, "best-of" genre reading lists, reader recommendations, and book group profiles. It was named a "Best New Magazine" shortly after its debut by Library Journal. Bookmarks magazine is based in Langhorne, Pennsylvania. It was previously headquartered in Chapel Hill, North Carolina.

Kurt Vonnegut also weighed in on one of the earlier issues; the September/October 2003 issue, which featured a profile on Vonnegut's life and works, prompted him to describe Bookmarks as "the first publication to summarize my career as a writer." "I am beguiled by your physical beauty," he continued, "and I am moved by how head-over-heels in love with books you are. And nowhere else have I found such thoughtful and literate reportage on the state of the American soul, as that soul makes itself known in the books we write. News of the hour indeed!"

References

External links
 Official website

2002 establishments in North Carolina
Bimonthly magazines published in the United States
Book review magazines
Literary magazines published in the United States
Magazines established in 2002
Magazines published in North Carolina
Magazines published in Pennsylvania
Mass media in Chapel Hill-Carrboro, North Carolina